Nikki Coates is a Grand Prix motorcycle racer from Great Britain.

Career statistics

2004- Irish 125cc Championship #65    Honda RS125R
2005- 32nd, British 125cc Championship #29    Honda RS125R
2006- 18th, British 125cc Championship #65    Honda RS125R
2007- 5th, British 125cc Championship #65    Honda RS125R
2008- 17th, British National Superstock 600 Championship #65    Honda CBR600RR
2009- 10th, British National Superstock 600 Championship #65    Yamaha YZF-R6
2010- 11th, British National Superstock 600 Championship #65    Yamaha YZF-R6
2011- 34th, CEV Moto2 Championship #65    AJR EVO 2011
2012- 15th, British Supersport Championship #65    Yamaha YZF-R6
2013- 26th, British Supersport Championship #85    Kawasaki ZX-6R
2014- NC, British National Superstock 1000 Championship #65    Kawasaki ZX-10R
2015- 27th, CEV Moto2 European Championship #65

Grand Prix motorcycle racing

By season

Races by year

References

External links
  Profile on motogp.com

British motorcycle racers
Living people
1989 births
Sportspeople from Belfast